Chalkidona is a municipality in the Thessaloniki regional unit, Greece. The seat of the municipality is Koufalia. The town is a hub for trucking traffic around the Thessaloniki area.

Municipality
The municipality Chalkidona was formed at the 2011 local government reform by the merger of the following 3 former municipalities, that became municipal units:
Agios Athanasios
Chalkidona
Koufalia

The municipality Chalkidona has an area of 391.4 km2, the municipal unit Chalkidona has an area of 130.0 km2, and the community Chalkidona has an area of 21.25 km2.

References

Municipalities of Central Macedonia
Populated places in Thessaloniki (regional unit)